Soletellina alba, commonly known as the white sunset shell, is a bivalve mollusc of the family Psammobiidae native to much of coastal Australia.

References

Psammobiidae
Bivalves of Australia
Bivalves described in 1818